Botaş SK is a sports club based in Ankara. The major branch of the club is the women's basketball, currently performing at the Turkish Women's Basketball Super League. The club also competes in athletics.

Botaş is the first Turkish club to play a final game in European women's basketball. The club was the runner up at the Ronchetti Cup in 2001 and won the Turkish Super League and Cup titles twice. Venue of the basketball team is DSİ Etlik Sports Hall.

Botaş SK is founded in 1984 and sponsored by Botaş Petroleum Pipeline Corporation since then. The club moved from Adana to Ankara in 2017.

Current squad

Honors

International competitions
 Ronchetti Cup
 Runners-up (1): 2000–2001
 Quarter Finals (1): 1999–2000
 EuroCup
 Eight Finals (3): 2006–2007, 2007–2008, 2009–2010

Domestic competitions
 Turkish Super League
 Winners (2): 2000–2001, 2002–2003
 Runners-up (3): 1992–1993, 1995–1996, 1996–1997
 Turkish Cup
 Winners (2): 2001–2002, 2002–2003
 Turkish President Cup
 Winners (2): 2003, 2004
 Runner-up (2): 1993, 1997

References

External links
Botaş SK official website 
Botaş SK at Turkish Basketball Federation
Botaş SK at EuroBasket

Sports teams in Ankara
Women's basketball teams in Turkey
Botaş SK players
Basketball teams established in 1984
Botaş